Vic Dhillon (born ) is a former politician in Ontario, Canada. He was a Liberal member of the Legislative Assembly of Ontario from 2003 to 2018 who represented the ridings of Brampton West—Mississauga and Brampton West.

Background
Dhillon has lived in Brampton, Ontario for most of his life. He has a degree in business administration from Lakehead University, and helped found a family-owned business in Mississauga after his graduation. He has done fundraising work for the Brampton Food Bank, and led a local initiative to send supplies to eastern Ontario during the ice storm of 1998. Dhillon worked as a constituency assistant to federal Liberal Member of Parliament (MP) Gurbax Singh Malhi for five months after the 1993 federal election, and then worked as an executive assistant to Liberal MP Colleen Beaumier for over nine years.

Politics
Dhillon ran in the 1999 provincial election as the Liberal candidate in the riding of Brampton West—Mississauga. He lost to high-profile Progressive Conservative cabinet minister Tony Clement by 8,310 votes. He ran again in the 2003 election and this time defeated Clement by 2,512 votes.  Most political observers considered this to be a significant upset. Strong support from the riding's Indo-Canadian community was a factor, as was a provincial swing to the Liberals. He was elected without difficulty in 2007 in the new riding of Brampton West. He was re-elected in 2011, and 2014.

In 2004, Dhillon was credited by local residents with saving Knights Table, a non-profit diner that provides meals for Brampton's poor and homeless.  According to a Toronto Star report, Dhillon introduced the diner's management to Jaswant Singh Birk, who in turn provided the establishment with a generous lease after its previous contract expired.

He was appointed as parliamentary assistant to the Minister of Government Services on September 20, 2006.

Dhillon supported Gerard Kennedy's bid to lead the Liberal Party of Canada in 2006. In December 2006, he introduced a private member's bill to protect transient workers from exploitation by hiring agencies. The bill was endorsed by the Toronto Star in the following week.

Dhillon took part in an Ontario government business mission to India in January 2007.

Until August 2016, Dhillon served as a Parliamentary Assistant to the Minister of Aboriginal Affairs. From August 2016 to May 2018, he served as Parliamentary Assistant to the Minister of Government and Consumer Services.

Dhillon ran for re-election in Brampton West in the 2018 Ontario election. He placed third, after the Progressive Conservative and New Democratic Party candidates.

Electoral record

References

External links

1969 births
21st-century Canadian politicians
Canadian politicians of Indian descent
Canadian Sikhs
Indian emigrants to Canada
Living people
Lakehead University alumni
Ontario Liberal Party MPPs
Politicians from Brampton
Punjabi people
Canadian politicians of Punjabi descent